Galeandra stangeana is a species of orchid. It is native to Brazil, Venezuela, Colombia, Peru and Bolivia.

References

stangeana
Orchids of South America
Plants described in 1856